Mitochondrial import receptor subunit TOM20 homolog is a protein that in humans is encoded by the TOMM20 gene. TOM20 is one of the receptor systems of the TOM complex (translocase of the outer membrane) in the outer mitochondrial membrane (OMM).

Function 
In mitochondrial protein import, TOM20 is closely associated with the pore-forming TOM40 complex and acts by recognizing and binding the N-terminal MTSs (matrix-targeting sequences), which form an amphipathic alpha helix and aid passage of the target proteins into the mitochondrial matrix.

See also 
 Mitochondria Outer Membrane Translocase
 TOMM22
 TOMM40
 TOMM70A

References

Further reading